For the Christmas Carol, see Little Drummer Boy.
Drummer Boy is an EP release by Christian folk group Jars of Clay featuring a new interpretation of the classic 1958 Christmas Carol "Little Drummer Boy".  The EP was originally released by Essential Records in the Christmas following the release of Jars Of Clay in 1995. The EP was re-released as a two-pack with Jars of Clay prior to their second album, Much Afraid.

Track listings

1995 release
"Little Drummer Boy" (Katherine K. Davis, Henry Onorati, Harry Simeone) – 4:23
"God Rest Ye Merry Gentlemen" (Unknown) – 3:03
"He" (Acoustic Version) (Charlie Lowell, Dan Haseltine, Matt Odmark, Stephen Mason, Matt Bronlewee) – 5:25
"The Little Drummer Boy" (Grinch Mix) (Katherine K. Davis, Henry Onorati, Harry Simeone) – 4:53

1997 release
"The Little Drummer Boy" (Katherine K. Davis, Henry Onorati, Harry Simeone)
"The Little Drummer Boy" (Grinch Mix) (Katherine K. Davis, Henry Onorati, Harry Simeone)
"Blind" (Fluffy Sav Mix) (Charlie Lowell, Dan Haseltine, Matt Odmark, Stephen Mason)
"Wicker Baskets" (Original instrumental piece) (Charlie Lowell, Dan Haseltine, Matt Odmark, Stephen Mason)

Personnel 

Robert Beeson – producer, executive producer, art direction, design
Matt Bronleewe – arranger
John Catchings – cello
Keith Compton – mixing
Tom Coyne – mastering
Dan Haseltine – producer
David Hoffner – hammered dulcimer
Scott Hughes – art direction, design
Jars of Clay – arranger, producer
J.B. – mixing
Mancy A'lan Kane – backing vocals
Steve Lipson – producer
Charlie Lowell – producer
Stephen Mason – producer
Heff Moraes – engineer, mixing
Matt Odmark – producer
Tamara Reynolds – photography
Doug Sarrett – assistant engineer, assistant
Jeff Savage – producer, drum programming
Scott Savage – conga, snare drum, rainstick, shaker, laughs
Rocky Schnaars – engineer
Matt Stanfield – producer, drum programming
Jackie Street – fretless bass
Bobby G. Taylor – oboe
Jim Widen – assistant engineer
Jason Wilder – mixing assistant
Jonathan Yudkin – mandolin, violin

References

1995 debut EPs
Jars of Clay EPs
Essential Records (Christian) EPs